The 2019 City of Wolverhampton Council election took place on 2 May 2019. It was held on the same day as other local elections.

Ward results

Bilston East

Bilston North

Blakenhall

Bushbury North

Bushbury South and Low Hill

East Park

Ettingshall

Fallings Park

Graiseley

Heath Town

Merry Hill

Oxley

Park

Penn

Spring Vale

St. Peter's

Tettenhall Regis

Tettenhall Wightwick

Wednesfield North

Wednesfield South

References

2019 English local elections
May 2019 events in the United Kingdom
2019
2010s in the West Midlands (county)